State Route 203 (SR-203) is a state highway in the U.S. state of Utah. Spanning , it serves as a north–south principal arterial road through eastern Ogden, connecting US-89 (Washington Boulevard), Weber State University, and SR-39 (12th Street).

Route description
State Route 203 begins in South Ogden at the intersection of Harrison Boulevard and Washington Boulevard (US-89. From there, it travels north via Harrison Boulevard through eastern Ogden, in the shadow of the Wasatch Range, passing Weber State University, Ogden High School, and the Ogden River before ending at 12th Street (SR-39) just below the mouth of Ogden Canyon.

The entire route is included in the National Highway System.

History
Part of Harrison Boulevard was first added to the state highway system in 1911 as what would become Utah State Route 39. State Route 39 originally ran east up 24th Street to Harrison Boulevard, then north along Harrison, then turning east on Valley Drive up Ogden Canyon. Later, in 1935, Harrison Boulevard south of SR-39 was added to the state highway system as Utah State Route 103, running from Route 39 (24th Street at the time) south to Route 5 (modern US-89). Harrison Boulevard north from SR-39 at Valley Drive to 2nd street was added in 1941 as Route 203, designated as continuing north on Harrison, past the Utah State Tuberculosis Sanatorium to 2nd Street, then west to the Army Supply Depot.

In 1953, the northern section of Harrison Boulevard was removed from SR-203, leaving that route entirely on 2nd Street. In 1964, SR-39 was realigned from Harrison and 24th to the new roadway constructed on 12th Street at the mouth of Ogden Canyon west to Washington Boulevard. At the same time, SR-203 was extended south along Harrison, re-adding the stretch between 2nd Street and Valley Drive, acquiring what had formerly been part of SR-39 between Valley Drive and 24th Street, and absorbing SR-103 in its entirety. As a result, SR-203 now ran from the Army Depot east along 2nd Street to Harrison, then south to the end of Harrison at present-day US-89, while SR-39 ran straight up 12th Street, and SR-103 was deleted from the state highway system until the route number was reused the following year.

In 1969, a number of minor state highways were deleted, and State Route 203 was not immune. The northmost  of the route were removed, comprising the roadway from SR-39 north to 2nd Street and west to the Army Depot, leaving the north end of SR-203 at SR-39 (12th Street), where it still remains.

Major intersections

References

203
 203
Ogden, Utah
Streets in Utah